Margots, also known as Eagle's Nest, Eagles Lodge, and Claybancke, is a historic home located near Tettington, Charles City County, Virginia. It was originally built about 1700, as a -story, three-bay brick structure above a basement, until raised by addition of a frame second story in the 19th century.  The house measures 44 feet, 4 inches, by 20 feet, 8 inches.  It is one of a few surviving circa 1700 medium-sized houses of Tidewater Virginia.  In 1973, the property was sold to the Virginia Commission of Game and Inland Fisheries by the Beale Estate.

It was added to the National Register of Historic Places in 1973.

References 

Houses on the National Register of Historic Places in Virginia
Houses completed in 1700
Houses in Charles City County, Virginia
National Register of Historic Places in Charles City County, Virginia
1700 establishments in Virginia